InfoSonics Corporation is a subsidiary of Cool Holdings, Inc., a publicly traded telecommunications equipment provider based in San Diego, California. It develops, manufactures, and distributes wireless handsets and accessories through its proprietary brand verykool and other private label brands. InfoSonics sells its products through carriers, distributors and OEMs in Latin America, Europe, Africa, Asia Pacific and the United States. It is best known for its line of inexpensive unlocked phones as well as its rugged phones in its verykool line of products.

History

InfoSonics was founded in 1994 by Joseph Ram, the company's president and CEO. It became a public company in June 2004, and was initially listed on the American Stock Exchange under the symbol “IFO.” In August 2006, the company transferred to the NASDAQ under the symbol “IFON.” When the company first went public, it was primarily a distributor of products supplied by Samsung, VK Corporation, LG, Novatel and others. In 2005 it purchased Primasel S.A., a distributor of Samsung products primarily in Argentina.

The company followed up with a secondary stock offering in 2006, offering 2.2 million shares. The same year the company reached $240 million in sales. 2006 was also the year it began to develop its own wireless handsets under the verykool brand. InfoSonics ceased its distributing business in March 2012, primarily due to protective import tariffs that had been enacted on certain electronic devices since 2009. After terminating its distributing business, it became solely a manufacturer and distributor of its own products under the verykool brand.

InfoSonics entered into an agreement with Ingram Micro in December 2012 for the distribution of its verykool brand to customers in the United States. It also launched an online store in the U.S. market for consumer purchase of the verykool product line.

InfoSonics Corporation reported a second consecutive quarter of profitability after 2013 4th quarter results were announced. The company had a 48% gross profit in the 4th quarter compared to 2012 with operating expenses declining 26% for the same period. InfoSonics also reported gross revenue of $37.9 million, an increase of $3.6 million from the year prior. It continued to increase sales by year-end 2014, bringing in $48.1 million, a 27% increase from the prior year.

References

External links
 Infosonics Official Website
 verykool Official Website

American companies established in 1994
Companies listed on the Nasdaq
Companies based in San Diego
Mobile phone manufacturers
Mobile phone companies of the United States